Tresus capax is a species of saltwater clam, marine bivalve mollusk, common name the fat gaper, in the family Mactridae. It also shares the common name horse clam with Tresus nuttallii a species which is similar in morphology and lifestyle. Both species are somewhat similar to the geoduck (Panopea generosa, which is in the family Hiatellidae), though smaller, with shells up to eight inches long (20 cm), weight to 3–4 lb (1.4–1.8 kg).

The two species commonly known as horse clams inhabit the Pacific coast intertidal zones: the pacific gaper, T. nuttallii, more abundant south to California; and the fat gaper, T. capax, more abundant north to Alaska. Both have oval and chalky-white or yellow shells with patches of brown periostracum (leather-like skin) on the shell. These clams are also commonly called gapers because their shells are flared around the siphon and do not completely close, rather like geoduck clams. Like geoducks, they are unable to completely retract the siphon within the shell, though less flagrantly as the siphon on Tresus species is not as large.

Identification 
An easy way to tell the two species apart is that T. nuttallii usually has relatively longer, narrower shells (longer compared to height) and larger siphonal plates (horny plates found at the tip of the siphon, often with a little algae or barnacles garden). Hence T. capax is the fat gaper.

Habitat and lifestyle 
Their habitat is the lower intertidal zones on out to waters as deep as 50–60 feet (13–15 m). They prefer sand, mud, and gravel substrates, normally burying themselves 12–16 inches (30–41 cm), so they are much easier to dig than geoducks. Their preferred substrates are also preferred by butter and littleneck clams, so horse clams are often taken incidentally in commercial harvesting.

Horse clams often have a relationship with small commensal pea crabs, Pinnixa faba, often a mating pair, which enter through the large siphon and live within the mantle cavity of the horse clam. The crabs are easily seen and in no way affect the clam as food. The meat is good and makes excellent chowder. They tend to be ignored by sport diggers in Washington but not in Oregon.

Horse clams are broadcast spawners like geoducks; T. nuttalii spawns in summer and T. capax in winter.

Harvesting for food 
Appreciated by pre-contact local Native Americans for their size, abundance, and relatively easy capture, they are less sought today than geoducks, which have gained a marketing cachet.

Identification is important. Best recipes vary with species. For resource sustainability, the Washington State Department of Fish and Wildlife  sets size and bag limits for these clams. The Department of Health sometimes closes beaches for public health and safety. The Department of Health Marine Biotoxin web site  has current information.

King County has a well-illustrated clam identification procedure .

Some clammers find horse clams are not as tasty as others, so it's not unusual during clamming season to find horse clams left behind on the beach. The shells are more fragile than they might appear, so it is critical that they not be damaged when first digging if they are not kept. The clams will soon die if abandoned. The adults are unable to rebury themselves—they need the pressure of their surroundings to remain intact and maneuver. They can't hold their two big valves together, protecting their soft tissues. Responsible diggers carefully rebury them to about the depth at which the clams were found.

Prehistorical exploitation 
Early exploitation of horse clams is known by Native Americans on the Pacific Ocean coast of California. For example, archaeological recovery from Chumash sites in San Luis Obispo County has revealed use of horse clam shells as a scoop implement. An unusually well decorated specimen was found at the present day town of Morro Bay during archaeological excavation.

Notes and references

Bibliography 
 
 
 
 C. Michael Hogan (2008) Morro Creek, The Megalithic Portal, ed. A. Burnham, February 28, 2008

Further reading 
 Abbreviated edition of the clam identification key by the Washington State Department of Fish and Wildlife at the King County Department of Natural Resources
 Science: Geoduck and Horseclam Biology, an overview by Underwater Harvesters Association, British Columbia, developers of underwater farming.

Mactridae
Marine molluscs of North America
Molluscs of the Pacific Ocean
Molluscs of the United States
Western North American coastal fauna
Fauna of California
Seafood in Native American cuisine
Bivalves described in 1850